Pontuz Bergman (stage name Wasted Penguinz) is a Swedish DJ and hardstyle producer. Wasted Penguinz was originally a duo act that consisted of Bergman and Jon Brandt-Cederhäll, who left in 2020.

Two years after the group was founded, Wasted Penguinz were signed to a major Dutch label, Scantraxx, in the summer of 2010. Their first Scantraxx release was on June 18, 2010. This release contained two tracks, "I'm Free" and "Anxiety", and was released on Scantraxx Silver. Their second release on Scantraxx Silver was in October 2010, containing the tracks "Hate Mondayz" and "Resistance".

All the tracks on both of their first two Scantraxx releases reached the "Hardstyle Top 100 of 2010" list from Fear.fm, the then-largest radio station devoted to harder styles of dance music. "Resistance" reached position 11, "Anxiety" reached position 23, "I'm Free" at 37, and finally "Hate Mondayz" at position 49. They also won the "Best New Face" award from Fear.fm. Fear.fm interviewed Pontuz & Jon, who revealed that they were in contact with Scantraxx since December 2009, and it was only made official in the summer of 2010.

The image created around their music is centred on consuming large amounts of beer, with their motto/tagline being "Get Wasted N' Do It". The Wasted Penguinz' YouTube account is used to upload previews, as well as videos of drinking contests & drinking games.

In 2011, they were booked for three major Dutch festivals in the summer: Intents Festival in Oisterwijk, Defqon.1 Festival in Biddinghuizen and Q-Base. The summer saw many new releases from the duo, all of which were released on Scantraxx.

In May 2012, the duo left Scantraxx as stated by "Wasted Penguinz" on Facebook.

The year after, in October, they signed with Toff Music and released the Raindropz single as well as their first album, Wistfulness.

In 2014, the duo remixed JoeySuki and Kill The Buzz single Life Is Calling.

They signed with the Belgian hardstyle label Dirty Workz later in 2014 and released their first track on the label titled "All For Nothing", followed by releases in 2016 named "Bitterness", "I Love You", "Paradise Is Lost", and most recently, "Inner Peace", an experimental hardstyle track.

In 2016 Jon & Pontuz released their second album on the 28th of October called "Clarity", consisting of 14 tracks with collaborations such as Crisis Era.

In 2018 the duo produced a third album called Elysian consisting of 12 tracks.

On 10 February 2020, Jon resigned from Wasted Penguinz due to mental health issues. After Jon left, Pontuz continued the brand on his own.

Releases
(white labels are not listed)

References

External links
Official website
Livesets

Swedish DJs
Living people
Hardstyle musicians
Electronic dance music DJs
Year of birth missing (living people)